Sylvia Scaffardi (born Crowther-Smith; 20 January 1902 – 27 January 2001) was a civil rights campaigner and one of the co-founders of the National Council for Civil Liberties (NCCL), later known as Liberty. Later in life, she became a published writer, with her first book published in 1982.

In the late 1980s, Scaffardi joined the Green Party UK.

Biography 

Scaffardi was working as an actress in London in 1926 when she met Ronald Kidd, with whom she went on to set up the NCCL. The formation of the NCCL in 1934 was the high point of their political collaboration, which ended with his death in 1942. Scaffardi continued to sit on the organisation's Executive Committee until the mid-1950s, and remained a lifelong supporter of Liberty.

Scaffardi was never religious and described herself as a "lifetime humanist".

At the age of 56, she married John Scaffardi, who died in 1971.

References 

1902 births
2001 deaths
English humanists
English atheists
Free speech activists
National Council for Civil Liberties people